Kūsankū (クーサンクー、公相君) or Kūshankū (クーシャンクー), also known as Kwang Shang Fu, was a Chinese martial artist who lived during the 18th century.  He is credited as having an influence on virtually all karate-derived martial arts.

Kūsankū learned the art of Ch'uan Fa in China from a Shaolin monk.  He was thought to have resided (and possibly studied martial arts) in Fujian province for much of his life.  Around 1756, Kūsankū was sent to Ryukyu as an ambassador of the Qing Dynasty.  He resided in the village of Kumemura, near Naha.  During his stay in Ryukyu, Kūsankū instructed Kanga Sakugawa.

Sakugawa trained under Kūsankū for six years.  After Kūsankū's death (around 1762), Sakugawa developed and named the Kusanku kata in honor of his teacher.

References

Chinese male karateka
1720s births
1790s deaths